The 1959 Pittsburgh Special mayoral election was held on Tuesday November 3, 1959. The winner of the 1957 election, Democrat David Lawrence, had resigned from his position in January 1959 because he was elected Governor of Pennsylvania. City Council President Tom Gallagher moved up to the position of mayor per the city charter. At 75 years old, he chose not to seek reelection. Joe Barr, also a Democrat, won the special election and the remainder of Lawrence's term. Barr, a powerful State Senator and a longtime Lawrence associate, defeated Republican Paul Reinhold, the president of a company that distributed road repair equipment.

Results

References

1959 Pennsylvania elections
1959 United States mayoral elections
1959
1950s in Pittsburgh
Pittsburgh 1959
November 1959 events in the United States
Pittsburgh, 1959